Seut Baraing is a Cambodian football player who currently plays for Phnom Penh Crown in the Cambodian League. He was born in September 29, 1999 in Siem Reap, Cambodia.

Club career
Baraing joined Cambodian side Phnom Penh Crown in 2011 and progressed through their youth ranks. He made his debut in February 2016 against Cambodian Tiger. He featured in both 2017 AFC Cup qualifying play-off games, as the Crown lost 7-3 over two legs to Singaporean side Home United.

International career
Baraing represented Cambodia's under 19 team at the 2016 AFF U-19 Youth Championship, playing in three games. He was first called up to the senior side in January 2017 and made his full international debut in a 7-2 loss to Saudi Arabia, in which he played 90 minutes.  Having impressed in this game, despite the result, head coach Leonardo Vitorino claimed he was the best left-back in the country. He cemented his place in the team, and made his second appearance in a 3-2 loss to India later the same year.

Career statistics

Club

International

Honours

Club
Phnom Penh Crown
Cambodian Premier League: 2022
 Cambodian Super Cup: 2022
 Cambodian League Cup: 2022

References

External links
 

Living people
1999 births
Cambodian footballers
Cambodia international footballers
People from Siem Reap province
Association football fullbacks
Phnom Penh Crown FC players
Competitors at the 2017 Southeast Asian Games
Competitors at the 2019 Southeast Asian Games
Southeast Asian Games competitors for Cambodia